Rock is an unincorporated community in Delta County, Michigan, United States. Rock has a post office with ZIP code 49880.

Demographics

History 
Rock was first settled in 1865 by Chicago and North Western Railway workers. J.R. Steele bought land in the community from the railroad in 1866 and settled there, and George English built a store there in the same year. The community was originally called Malton Spur, and a post office called Malton operated from March 28, 1879, to April 30, 1883; Henrietta Crawford served as postmaster of this post office. The community was then renamed Maple Ridge, but changed its name again to Rock when applying for a new post office. The new name was coined by John Niequist and was derived from the rocky terrain in the area. The new post office opened on June 16, 1886, with Niequist as postmaster.

Climate
This climatic region is typified by large seasonal temperature differences, with warm to hot (and often humid) summers and cold (sometimes severely cold) winters.  According to the Köppen Climate Classification system, Rock has a humid continental climate, abbreviated "Dfb" on climate maps.

References

External links
 Rock Centennial Section, The Delta Reporter, Gladstone, MI, September 1, 1965

Census-designated places in Michigan
Census-designated places in Delta County, Michigan
Unincorporated communities in Michigan
Unincorporated communities in Delta County, Michigan
Populated places established in 1865